Ethylphenidate (EPH), also known as Baxtercaine in the United Kingdom is a psychostimulant and a close analog of methylphenidate.

Ethylphenidate acts as both a dopamine reuptake inhibitor and norepinephrine reuptake inhibitor, meaning it effectively boosts the levels of the norepinephrine and dopamine neurotransmitters in the brain, by binding to, and partially blocking the transporter proteins that normally remove those monoamines from the synaptic cleft.

However, considering the close similarities between ethylphenidate and methylphenidate and the fact that methylphenidate, like cocaine, actually does not primarily act as a "classical" reuptake inhibitor, but rather as an "inverse agonist at the DAT" (also called a "negative allosteric modulator at the DAT"), it is at least very likely that ethylphenidate also primarily acts as an inverse DAT agonist instead of (or at least only secondarily) as a classical reuptake inhibitor (which could be called a "competitive antagonist at the DAT" using a similar terminology as "negative allosteric modulator at the DAT", which per definition means that its mechanism is non-competitive).

Pharmacokinetics

Ethylphenidate metabolizes into methylphenidate and ritalinic acid.

Tiny amounts of ethylphenidate can be formed in vivo when ethanol and methylphenidate are coingested, via hepatic transesterification.  Ethylphenidate formation appears to be more common when large quantities of methylphenidate and alcohol are consumed at the same time, such as in non-medical use or overdose scenarios.  However, the transesterfication process of methylphenidate to ethylphenidate, as tested in mice liver, was dominant in the inactive (−)-enantiomer but showed a prolonged and increased maximal plasma concentration of the active (+)-enantiomer of methylphenidate. Additionally, only a few percent of the consumed methylphenidate is converted to ethylphenidate.

This carboxylesterase-dependent transesterification process is also known to occur when cocaine and alcohol are consumed together, forming cocaethylene.

Pharmacodynamics
All available data on ethylphenidate's pharmacokinetics are drawn from studies conducted on rodents. Ethylphenidate is more selective to the dopamine transporter (DAT) than methylphenidate, having approximately the same efficacy as the parent compound, but has significantly less activity on the norepinephrine transporter (NET). Its dopaminergic pharmacodynamic profile is nearly identical to methylphenidate, and is primarily responsible for its euphoric and reinforcing effects.

The eudysmic ratio for ethylphenidate is superior to that of methylphenidate.

The following is ethylphenidate's binding profile in the mouse, alongside methylphenidate's. Figures for both the racemic and the dextrorotary enantiomers are given:

Legality 
 Ethylphenidate is not controlled internationally; see Convention on Psychotropic Substances
 Ethylphenidate is illegal in the Netherlands, as the Opium Law Lijst I covers it, as of 27 April 2018 
 Ethylphenidate is not explicitly controlled in the US as part of the Controlled Substances Act but it could possibly be considered an analog of a Schedule II substance (methylphenidate) under the Federal Analog Act if sold for human consumption.
 Ethylphenidate is illegal in Sweden as of 15 December 2012.
 Ethylphenidate is illegal to manufacture, distribute or import in the UK, as of 10 April 2015 it has been placed under a Temporary Class Drug Order which automatically places it in a Class-B-like category. Though ordinarily the TCDO would only last 1 year, the ACMD reported that since its invocation prevalence of MPA had significantly decreased, and that it had been challenging to collect information about the drug. As a result of this, they requested that the TCDO be extended a further year from 26 June 2016.
 Ethylphenidate is illegal in Jersey under the Misuse of Drugs (Jersey) Law 1978.
 Australian state and federal legislation contains provisions that mean that analogues of controlled drugs are also covered by the legislation. Ethylphenidate would be an analogue of methylphenidate under this legislation.
 Ethylphenidate is controlled in Canada under the Controlled Drugs and Substances Act under Schedule III as of 05.05.2017.
 Ethylphenidate is illegal in Germany as of 05.07.2013 
 Ethylphenidate is illegal in Austria by the "Neue Psychoaktive Substanzen Gesetz" (=new psychoactive substances act) NPSG since 1 January 2012
 Ethylphenidate is illegal in Denmark as of 1 February 2013.
 Ethylphenidate is illegal in Poland by "the Act on Counteracting Drug Addiction" since 1 July 2015 
 It is illegal in Lithuania to use, buy, possess, transport, sell or import Ethylphenidate from 2015 
 As of October 2015 Ethylphenidate is a controlled substance in China.

See also 
 3,4-Dichloromethylphenidate
 4-Fluoroethylphenidate
 HDEP-28
 HDMP-28
 Naphthylisopropylamine
 Naphyrone
 2β-Propanoyl-3β-(2-naphthyl)-tropane (WF-23)
 Isopropylphenidate
 Propylphenidate
 Cocaethylene (compound formed when cocaine and ethanol are taken together)
 Methylphenidate
 Ethanol (drinking alcohol)

References 

Alcohol
Drug culture
Ethyl esters
2-Benzylpiperidines
Sympathomimetic amines
Norepinephrine–dopamine reuptake inhibitors
Stimulants
Designer drugs
Euphoriants
2-Piperidinyl compounds